Kyowa Dam is a gravity dam located in Akita Prefecture in Japan. The dam is used for flood control and water supply. The catchment area of the dam is 24.4 km2. The dam impounds about 49  ha of land when full and can store 7800 thousand cubic meters of water. The construction of the dam was started on 1979 and completed in 1997.

References

Dams in Akita Prefecture
1997 establishments in Japan